The 2017–18 Southern Combination Football League season was the 93rd in the history of the competition, which lies at levels 9 and 10 of the English football league system.

The constitution was announced on 26 May 2017.

Premier Division

The Premier Division consisted of 20 clubs, the same as last season, after Wick and Hailsham Town were relegated to Division One, and Shoreham were promoted to Isthmian League Division One South.

Three clubs joined the division:
 East Preston – promoted from Division One
 Saltdean United – promoted from Division One
 Three Bridges – relegated from Isthmian League Division One South

With the suspension of ground grading Grade E for this season and the creation of a new league at Steps 3 and 4, the champions of all Step 5 leagues were compulsorily promoted to Step 4. Of the fourteen runners-up, the twelve clubs with the best PPG (points per game ratio) were also to be compulsorily promoted, but with resignations and mergers in leagues above, thirteen runners-up were promoted.

Teams at Step 5 without ground grading Grade F were to be relegated to Step 6, but no club in this division failed the ground grading process. All Step 5 leagues were fixed at 20 clubs for 2018–19.

League table

Results table

Division One

Division One featured 16 clubs which competed in the division last season, along with two new clubs, relegated from the Premier Division:
Hailsham Town
Wick

Step 6 clubs without ground grading Grade G were to be relegated to Step 7, but no club in this division failed the ground grading process. All Step 6 leagues were fixed at a maximum of 20 clubs for 2018–19.

League table

Results table

Division Two

Division Two featured 15 clubs which competed in the division last season, no new clubs joined this season.

Promotion from this division depended on ground grading as well as league position.

Also, Worthing Town Leisure reverted to the name of Worthing Town after their merger with Worthing Leisure F.C. was ended after one season.

League table

References

2017-18
9